is a Japanese snowboarder. He won the freestyle overall and big air at the 2018–19 FIS Snowboard World Cup and the gold medal in the big air event at the Norway 2018 and 2019 editions of the Winter X Games.

References

External links
 
 
 
 

2001 births
Living people
Japanese male snowboarders
Olympic snowboarders of Japan
Snowboarders at the 2022 Winter Olympics
21st-century Japanese people
X Games athletes